Olavi Katajisto (30 June 1916 – 10 September 2004) was a Finnish chess player.

Biography
In the 1950s Olavi Katajisto was one of Finland's leading chess players. He played mainly in domestic chess tournaments and Finnish Chess Championships. In 1951, Olavi Katajisto won Helsinki  Chess Championship.

Olavi Katajisto played for Finland in the Chess Olympiad: In 1954, at third board in the 11th Chess Olympiad in Amsterdam (+5, =6, -5).

References

External links

Olavi Katajisto chess games at 365chess.com

1916 births
2004 deaths
20th-century chess players
Chess Olympiad competitors
Finnish chess players